REDVolution Shows are the music stage shows performed by Ni Ni Khin Zaw.

REDVolution Show, 2017

The first REDvolution Show was held in People's Square and Park on 1 April 2017. This is the very first one lady show in her career life of 9 years. She presented with Gita Kabyar Orchestra, Oxygen Music Band and Secret Pieces (Dance Group). She also sang some duet songs with other famous singers.

Major Parts
There are three major parts in the show.
Opening
Band
Orchestra and Dance

Songs
Opening Part
Super Red +Mario
Super Sunday
Thitsar Ma Pyat Kyay
A Way Yout Nay Par Thaw Lal
Band Part
Nin Lo At Khal Yin
Ma Kwal Khin
Myaw Lint Sal
Su Taung Tway Pyae Chin Tal+Moe Tain Kabyar + A Yaung Ma Soe Nal(with Nine One)
Orchestra Part
Mingalarbar (with Aung Htet)
InnLay Mar Ywar Tal Moe
Kyay Khyun (With Mi Sandi)
Yat (Stop)
A Shone Ma Pay Nal
Ma Lo Chinn Bu Sit
Myaw Lint Chat Ta Sone Ta Yar
Dance
Lay Yin Pyan
Yat Sat Twar Thu
Youne Lite Tine Hmar
Yan Thu
Soe Yain Chit
Bad Boy
Gal Pal Gal Pal
Close Song
Water Party Yay Party

Retro REDVolution Show, 2018
The second show for REDVolution show is "Retro REDVolution show" which was performed with retro theme. It was held in Yangon on 7 and 8 April 2018 for two days. This is her 2nd one lady show after REDvolution Show, presented in April 2017. This show was held finely for her 10th years Anniversary of her career life.

Parts
Marilyn Monroe Style

Fresly Style

Musical 

India Dance 

Dance

Songs
Marilyn Monroe Style
REDVolution Show Theme Song
Good Kisser
Lay Yin Pyan
Melody World Songs(Ma Nyar Talt Buu+Ma Lwan Yal Thay Buu+Na Maw Na Mal+Hont Sat Htwat Kwar Chin+Yat)
Stand by Me
Fresly Style
Super Red(Dance of Secret Pieces)
Byin
Soe Yain Chit
A Yeit Ta Khu Paing Saing Chin
Yat Sat Twar Thu
Yat Sat Tal Moe
Thitsar Ma Pyat Kyay
A Yaung Ma Soe Nal
Ah Lat Kar Pal
Muu
Musical
Kayay Lan Diary
Moe Sat Tin Lay
Inlay Hmar Ywar Tal Moe
India Dance
Mario
Nin A Na Na
Dance
Million Dollar Baby
Yan Thu
Bad Boy
Water Party Yay Party 
U

Party REDVolution Show, 2019
The third show for REDVolution show is "Party REDVolution show" which was performed on 2 November 2019 in Mandalay.

Party

LATINO

Hit Songs

Disco

Songs

Party
REDVolution Theme Song + Party Khin Zaw
Mario
Lay Yin Pyan
L.O.V.E
Htine Hta
Super Red

Latino
Bon Pa Pa
Nay Win Chain
U
Yan Thu
Chit Chin Tat Chin
Bad Boy

Hit Songs
Byim
A Sin Pyay Par Tal
Myaw Lint Sal
A Lat Kar Pal
A Yaung Ma Soe Nal
Soe Yain Chit
Ma Kwal Khin
Thitsar Ma Pyat Kyay
Chit Hlyat Lan Kwal
A Chit Ya Sone Thu Sain

Disco
Bloody Red
Million Dollar Baby
Nint Nar Nar
Summer
Stand by me
Gal Pal Gal Pal

References

External links
Official Facebook

Concerts
Burmese music